Claudiu Nicolae Boaru (born 10 April 1977) is a retired Romanian footballer who played his entire career for Gaz Metan Mediaş. After the retirement, Boaru continued to work for Gaz Metan Mediaş as assistant coach or sporting manager until team's dissolution in 2022.

Career
Boaru played for Gaz Metan Mediaş from 1997 to 2009, scoring 108 goals in 315 league appearances.

After he retired from playing, Boaru became a football coach. He began managing Gaz Metan's reserve team in 2012.

Honours
Gaz Metan Mediaș
Divizia B: 1999–2000

See also
List of one-club men

References

External links
 

1977 births
Living people
People from Mediaș
Romanian footballers
Association football forwards
Liga I players
Liga II players
CS Gaz Metan Mediaș players